Nikolai Boris Popov (born 1952) is a translator.

Life
He graduated from University of Washington, with a Ph.D., in 1994. 
In 2001, he participated at a conference at University of Iowa International Writing Program.
He teaches English and Comparative Literature at the University of Washington. A James Joyce scholar and translator, he co-translated with Heather McHugh a collection of the poems of Blaga Dimitrova, and Paul Celan. On May 13, 2012, he fell into a crevasse while skiing near Whistler but was unscathed.

From 1987 to 2010 he was married to poet Heather McHugh.

Awards
2001 Griffin Poetry Prize

Translations

References

External links
Nikolai Popov, Harper's Magazine

 Griffin Poetry Prize biography
 Griffin Poetry Prize reading, including video clip

Living people
1952 births
University of Washington faculty
Bulgarian translators
Translators to English
Translators from German
Translators from Bulgarian
Bulgarian emigrants to the United States